MGM is Metro-Goldwyn-Mayer, an American media and film company.

MGM may also refer to:

Arts, entertainment, and media
 MGM (TV channel)
 MGM Distribution, a record label
 MGM Records, a record label
 Sony Pictures Studios, former MGM studio, Culver City, California, US
 Militärgeschichtliche Mitteilungen, a German magazine of military history

Brands and enterprises
 Disney-MGM Studios, former name of the theme park Disney's Hollywood Studios at Walt Disney World Resort, US
 MGM Energy a Canadian petroleum company
 MGM Group of Companies (M. G. Muthu Group), Chennai, India
 MGM Dizzee World, a theme park in Chennai, South India
 MGM Resorts International, a Las Vegas, Nevada-based US owner of casinos and hotels
MGM Macau
MGM Grand (disambiguation), multiple properties
MGM Mirage Aviation
MGM National Harbor, Oxon Hill, Maryland
MGM Northfield Park, Northfield, Ohio
MGM Springfield, Springfield, Massachusetts
Park MGM, Las Vegas, Nevada

Transportation
 Metheringham railway station, England, station code
 Montgomery Regional Airport, Alabama, US, airport code

Other uses
 Mid Glamorgan, preserved county in Wales, Chapman code
 Mobile–surface attack–guided missile, a US military designation
 Maureen G. Mulvaney, also known as MGM, American speaker and author

See also
 MGM/UA (disambiguation)